Emilio Bobadilla (24 June 1862, Cárdenas, Cuba - 1 January 1921, Biarritz, France) was a Cuban writer, poet, literary critic and journalist. He also wrote under the pseudonym "Fray Candil".

Bibliography

Poetry
Sal y Pimienta, (colección de epigramas) for Dagoberto Mármara, 1881
Relámpagos, poems, Havana, 1884
Mostaza, epigrams, 1885
Fiebres, poems, Madrid, 1889
Vórtice, poems, 1902
Rojeces de Marte, poems, 1921
Selección de poemas, 1962

Literary criticism
Capirotazos, satire and criticism, 1890
Críticas instantáneas, 1891
Triquitraques, 1892
Solfeo, 1894
La vida intelectual I. Batiburrillo, literary criticism, 1895
Escaramuzas, satire and criticism, Madrid, 1898.
Grafómanos de América, 1902
Al través de mis nervios, criticism, 1903
Sintiéndome vivir. Salidas de tono, Madrid, 1906
Muecas, criticism and satire, París, 1908
Crítica y sátira, 1964

Storytelling
Novelas en germen, 1900
A fuego lento, novel, Barcelona, 1903
En la noche dormida, erotic novel, Madrid, 1913
En pos de la paz. Pequeñeces de la vida diaria, novel, Madrid, 1917

Travel book and chronicle
Viajando por España, Madrid, 1912
Bulevar arriba, bulevar abajo (Psicología al vuelo), 1911

Newspaper articles
Reflejos de Fray Candil, Havana, 1886
Con la capucha vuelta, chronicle, París, 1909
Artículos periodísticos de Emilio Bobadilla, 1952

References

1862 births
1921 deaths
Cuban male poets
Cuban journalists
Male journalists
People from Cárdenas, Cuba